Eastbridge was a railroad station on the east bank of the Colorado River in Mohave County, Arizona, United States.  It was located at the site of the first bridge the Atlantic and Pacific Railroad built across that river, three miles southeast of Needles, in San Bernardino County, California.

History
The wooden bridge across the Colorado River constructed between Eastbridge station and the California bank in 1883 was built across the wet alluvial soils of the flood plain of the Mohave Valley.  The site had no solid base on either bank and was over 1600 feet wide.  The construction was conducted during the flood season of the Colorado that began in May.  For three months, the building crews struggled to drive wooden pilings into the river bed only to see them washed out by the river.  Pilings were only driven into the mid river section with the help of a pile driver mounted on Barge No. 3, towed and held in position by the Mohave II.   This first bridge, when completed in August was still vulnerable to flooding and was washed out or undermined by the spring flooding of the river and had to be replaced in 1884, 1886 and 1888.  Finally the railroad changed its route southward along the California bank, to Beal, then to a place opposite Mellen, where from 1889 to May 1890 they built the Red Rock Bridge, a cantilever bridge, on rock foundations, unlike the previous site.  After completion of the bridge, the section of track between the point where the line changed direction to the new bridge, to the station of Powell and to the bridge and station at Eastbridge, was abandoned in 1890.

References

External links
  Map of the 5th Operating Division of the Western Division, Atlantic & Pacific R.R., From Peach Springs to Needles. W.A. Drake, Acting Chief Engineer. Drawing No. J-2-902. from davidrumsey.com accessed July 20, 2015.  This map was one of a set of six hand-drawn maps made in 1882 on semi-transparent waxed linen with some color, illustrating the route Lewis Kingman surveyed from Albuquerque to Needles.  It was intended to be printed but never was, due possibly to the problems at the bridge at Eastbridge, shown on this map, from 1884 to 1890.
  Old A & P pile bridge built just east of Needles by Atlantic and Pacific Railroad in 1883.  Looking west from Arizona side.  The drawbridge on California side does not show.  The steel bridge at Topock was built in 1889 and this wooden bridge torn down in 1890. from hdl.huntington.org accessed July 25, 2015.  Photo taken in 1883.

Ghost towns in Arizona
Former populated places in Mohave County, Arizona
1883 establishments in Arizona Territory
Populated places established in 1883